The Simaroubaceae are a small, mostly tropical, family in the order Sapindales. In recent decades, it has been subject to much taxonomic debate, with several small families being split off. A molecular phylogeny of the family was published in 2007, greatly clarifying relationships within the family. Together with chemical characteristics such as the occurrence of petroselinic acid in Picrasma, in contrast to other members of the family such as Ailanthus, this indicates the existence of a subgroup in the family with Picrasma, Holacantha, and Castela.

The best-known species is the temperate Chinese tree-of-heaven Ailanthus altissima, which has become a cosmopolitan weed tree of urban areas and wildlands.

Well-known genera in the family include the tropical Quassia and Simarouba.

Genera
 
Ailanthus 
†Ailanthophyllum 
Amaroria 
Brucea 
Castela 
Eurycoma 
Gymnostemon 
Hannoa 
Iridosma 
Leitneria 
Nothospondias 
Odyendea 
Perriera 
Picrasma 

Picrolemma 
Pierreodendron 
Quassia 
Samadera 
Simaba 
Simarouba 
Soulamea

Excluded genera

Allantospermum  → Ixonanthaceae
Alvaradoa  → Picramniaceae
Desbordesia  → Irvingiaceae
Harrisonia  → Rutaceae
Irvingia  → Irvingiaceae
Kirkia  → Kirkiaceae
Klainedoxa  → Irvingiaceae
Picramnia  → Picramniaceae
Recchia  → Surianaceae

References

External links

 
Sapindales families